The 1996 Peach Bowl featured the Clemson Tigers and LSU Tigers.

LSU scored the final 10 points of the game after Clemson took an early 7–0 lead. After an LSU turnover in the first quarter, Clemson quarterback Nealon Greene ran for a five-yard touchdown. LSU subsequently went on an 80-yard drive capped by Kevin Faulk's three-yard touchdown run. Wade Richey kicked a field goal late in the second quarter for LSU. Neither team was able to score in the second half.

References

External links
Game statistics

Peach Bowl
Peach Bowl
Clemson Tigers football bowl games
LSU Tigers football bowl games
December 1996 sports events in the United States
Peach Bowl
1996 in Atlanta